Henry Fairchild may refer to:
Henry Fairchild (1815–1889), American educator and abolitionist
Henry Pratt Fairchild (1880–1956), American sociologist